Frank Carter (born 27 October 1942) is a British diver. He competed in the men's 3 metre springboard event at the 1968 Summer Olympics.

References

1942 births
Living people
British male divers
Olympic divers of Great Britain
Divers at the 1968 Summer Olympics
Sportspeople from Wigan